The 2017 Algerian Super Cup was the  11th edition of the Algerian Super Cup, a football match contested by the winners of the 2016–17 Algerian Ligue Professionnelle 1 and 2016–17 Algerian Cup competitions. It is known as the Mobilis Supercoupe d'Algérie 2017 due to the start of a sponsorship deal with Mobilis ATM The match was played on November 1, 2017 at Stade Mohamed Hamlaoui in Constantine. between 2016-17 Ligue 1 winners ES Sétif and 2016–17 Algerian Cup winners CR Belouizdad.

Match

Pre-match 
The match between the two teams are the first of its kind in the Super Cup ES Sétif looking for the second in the fourth final and the CR Belouizdad for the first in the second final after 22 years, as a whole season play on November 1, the date of the outbreak of the Algerian revolution was chosen Stadium of the East Capital Stade Mohamed Hamlaoui theater of this confrontation second after 2015. the two teams met in the final of the Algerian Cup last season and won Al Shabab for a single goal, but this season the coach changed from Moroccan Badou Zaki to Serbian Ivica Todorov also ES Sétif looking for a rehabilitation after he deprived him of the league and cup Doubles last season.

Summary
the game was not of a good standard and most of its periods were boring as there were not many serious chances with a preference for ES Sétif to end matches with a draw 0-0 the two teams go straight to the penalty shootout In the first shot of the CR Belouizdad, they were lost by defender Namani and in the next throw, ES Sétif captain Abdelmoumene Djabou lost the second shot, after which the two teams scored all their kicks until the fourth shot, where the CR Belouizdad striker Mohamed Amine Hamia lost to give Hamza Aït Ouamar a chance to score the winning kick for the title. And after the end of the matches Al Shabab player Zakaria Draoui won the best player award from the organizing committee then the Minister of Youth and Sports El Hadi Ould Ali gave Super Cup to the captain Djabou. and in the presence of the President of the Ligue de Football Professionnel Mahfoud Kerbadj and the President of the FAF Kheiredine Zetchi, both teams will receive 100 million dinars equivalent to 86,000 dollars from the official sponsor of the competition Mobilis ATM. on the other hand, the coach Kheïreddine Madoui became more than the winner of the Super Cup for the second time in its history after the first in 2015.

Match details

See also
 2016–17 Algerian Ligue Professionnelle 1
 2016–17 Algerian Cup

Notes

References 

2017
Supercup